Nigerian recording artist Runtown has released one studio album, seventeen singles and ten music videos. His debut single was released in 2007 as an upcoming artist. He shot to limelight in 2014 upon the release of "Gallardo", a song which features vocals from Davido and was released as the first single off his debut studio album Ghetto University. Gallardo went on to win "Best Collaboration of the Year" at the 2014 edition of the Nigeria Entertainment Awards. On 23 November 2015, Runtown released his debut studio album titled Ghetto University via MTN Music Plus through Eric Many Entertainment. The album generated over ₦35million on the music portal thus earning him a spot in the list of "Top 5 Most Streamed Artist".

Studio albums

Singles

As lead artist

As featured artist

Said 

By Nasty C ft. Runtown     2017

Music videos

References

Discographies of Nigerian artists